Lívia Győrbiró (born 8 September 1974) is a Hungarian windsurfer. She competed in the women's Mistral One Design event at the 2004 Summer Olympics.

References

1974 births
Living people
Hungarian female sailors (sport)
Hungarian windsurfers
Olympic sailors of Hungary
Sailors at the 2004 Summer Olympics – Mistral One Design
Sportspeople from Budapest
21st-century Hungarian women
Female windsurfers